Tamlaght is a townland (of 185 acres) and  village in County Fermanagh, Northern Ireland, 4.5 km south-east of Enniskillen. It is situated in the civil parish of Derryvullan and the historic barony of Tirkennedy. In the 2001 Census it had a population of 276 people.

People 
Roy Carroll (born September 30, 1977 in Enniskillen) is a Northern Irish footballer and plays as a goalkeeper was brought up in Tamlaght.

Lord Anthony Hamilton, son of James Hamilton, 4th Duke of Abercorn, and Lady (Katie) Hamilton live at Killyreagh House, on Ballylucas Road.

See also 
 List of townlands in County Fermanagh
 List of towns and villages in Northern Ireland
 Tamlaght, County Londonderry
 Tallaght, County Dublin

References 

 NI Neighbourhood Information System

Villages in County Fermanagh
Townlands of County Fermanagh
Civil parish of Derryvullan